Mother of thousands is a common name for several plants, including:

 Cymbalaria muralis
 Kalanchoe daigremontiana
 Saxifraga stolonifera
 Soleirolia soleirolii

See also
 Mother of millions, Kalanchoe delagoensis, formerly Bryophyllum delagoense